Tor yunnanensis is a species of ray-finned fish in the family Cyprinidae. It is found only in Fuxian Lake in Yunnan, China. It has been severely impacted by the introduced species of fish, pollution, and overfishing, and not seen after the 1990s.

References

Endemic fauna of Yunnan
Freshwater fish of China
Taxa named by Wang You-Huai
Fish described in 1982
Taxonomy articles created by Polbot
Taxobox binomials not recognized by IUCN